David Greczek (born October 29, 1994) is an American professional soccer player who plays as a goalkeeper for FC Motown.

Career

College and youth
Greczek grew up in Fairfield Township, Essex County, New Jersey and attended West Essex High School. He played four years of college soccer at Rutgers University between 2013 and 2016. While at college, Greczek also appeared for USL PDL side Jersey Express in 2016.

Professional
On January 17, 2017, Greczek was drafted in the third-round (58th overall) during the 2017 MLS SuperDraft by Sporting Kansas City. He signed with Kansas City's United Soccer League affiliate club Swope Park Rangers on February 8, 2017.

Ahead of the 2019 season, Greczek signed for NPSL team FC Motown.

On September 5, 2019, he joined USL League One club Greenville Triumph SC. However, he failed to make an appearance for Greenville.

Ahead of the 2021 season, Greczek rejoined FC Motown.

References

External links 
 

1994 births
Living people
American people of Polish descent
Rutgers Scarlet Knights men's soccer players
Jersey Express S.C. players
Sporting Kansas City II players
Association football goalkeepers
Soccer players from New Jersey
Sporting Kansas City draft picks
USL League Two players
USL Championship players
People from Fairfield Township, Essex County, New Jersey
Sportspeople from Essex County, New Jersey
West Essex High School alumni
American soccer players
FC Motown players
Greenville Triumph SC players
National Premier Soccer League players